The fourth deputy prime minister, officially Fourth Vice President of the Government, is a senior member of the Government of Spain. The office of the Fourth Deputy Prime Minister is not a permanent position, existing only at the discretion of the Prime Minister. It is a constitutional office because it is foreseen in the Constitution when it provides for the possibility of existing more than one Vice Presidency. The office is currently abolished.

History and powers
It is an office of new creation established on 13 January 2020. Teresa Ribera, minister for the Ecological Transition was appointed as the first officeholder.

The office of fourth deputy prime minister does not possess special constitutional powers beyond its responsibility as a member of the Council of Ministers. The position is regulated in the Government Act of 1997 and it only specifies that the raison d'être of the office is to replace the Prime Minister when the office is vacant, or the premier is absence or ill. The fourth deputy prime minister only assume this responsibility if the first, second and third deputies could not do it.

The office was abolished on 12 July 2021, when Prime Minister Pedro Sánchez promoted Teresa Ribera to third deputy prime minister.

List of officeholders
Office name:
Fourth Vice Presidency of the Government (2020–2021)

References

See also
 Deputy Prime Minister of Spain
 Second Deputy Prime Minister of Spain
 Third Deputy Prime Minister of Spain

Lists of political office-holders in Spain
Deputy Prime Ministers of Spain